Qaleh-ye Abdollah Beygi (also Romanized as Qal‘eh-ye ‘Abdollah Beygī; also known as ‘Abdolābād, Qal‘eh-ye ‘Abdollāh, and Qal‘eh-ye ‘Abdollāh Beyk) is a village in Shesh Pir Rural District, Hamaijan District, Sepidan County, Fars Province, Iran. At the 2006 census, its population was 56, in 17 families.

References 

Populated places in Sepidan County